Nick Hayes is a British writer, illustrator, and campaigner for land access. He has written a number of graphic novels and a non-fiction book, The Book of Trespass.

Life and work
Hayes grew up in Upper Basildon, Berkshire.

He works as an illustrator. In 2004 he was a  founding editor of Meat Magazine.

In August 2020, Hayes and Guy Shrubsole launched a campaign on freedom to roam in England, called Right to Roam. In July 2021 he and Shrubsole collaborated with Landscapes of Freedom and David Bangs to organise a mass trespass on the Sussex Downs to raise awareness of the failings of the 2000 CROW act, which Shrubsole claims still only gives the public access to 8% of land and 3% of rivers in England.

Publications

Graphic novels
The Rime of the Modern Mariner. Jonathan Cape, 2011. .
Woody Guthrie and the Dust Bowl Ballads. Harry N. Abrams, 2016. .
Cormorance. Jonathan Cape, 2016. .
The Drunken Sailor. Jonathan Cape, 2018. .

Non-fiction books
The Book of Trespass: Crossing the Lines that Divide Us. London: Bloomsbury, 2020. .

See also
Trespass to land in English law

References

External links 
 

English graphic novelists
English illustrators
21st-century British writers
Living people
Year of birth missing (living people)
People from West Berkshire District
English social justice activists
British waterways activists
Writers about activism and social change